Visual Studio Code, also commonly referred to as VS Code, is a source-code editor made by Microsoft with the Electron Framework, for Windows, Linux and macOS. Features include support for debugging, syntax highlighting, intelligent code completion, snippets, code refactoring, and embedded Git. Users can change the theme, keyboard shortcuts, preferences, and install extensions that add functionality.

In the Stack Overflow 2022 Developer Survey, Visual Studio Code was ranked the most popular developer environment tool among 71,010 respondents, with 74.48% reporting that they use it.

History 

Visual Studio Code was first announced on April 29, 2015, by Microsoft at the 2015 Build conference. A preview build was released shortly thereafter.

On November 18, 2015, the source of Visual Studio Code was released under the MIT License, and made available on GitHub. Extension support was also announced. On April 14, 2016, Visual Studio Code graduated from the public preview stage and was released to the Web. Microsoft has released most of Visual Studio Code's source code on GitHub under the permissive MIT License, while the releases by Microsoft are proprietary freeware.

Features 
Visual Studio Code is a source-code editor that can be used with a variety of programming languages, including C, C#, C++, Fortran, Go, Java, JavaScript, Node.js, Python, Rust. It is based on the Electron framework, which is used to develop Node.js web applications that run on the Blink layout engine. Visual Studio Code employs the same editor component (codenamed "Monaco") used in Azure DevOps (formerly called Visual Studio Online and Visual Studio Team Services).

Out of the box, Visual Studio Code includes basic support for most common programming languages. This basic support includes syntax highlighting, bracket matching, code folding, and configurable snippets. Visual Studio Code also ships with IntelliSense for JavaScript, TypeScript, JSON, CSS, and HTML, as well as debugging support for Node.js. Support for additional languages can be provided by freely available extensions on the VS Code Marketplace.

Instead of a project system, it allows users to open one or more directories, which can then be saved in workspaces for future reuse. This allows it to operate as a language-agnostic code editor for any language. It supports many programming languages and a set of features that differs per language. Unwanted files and folders can be excluded from the project tree via the settings. Many Visual Studio Code features are not exposed through menus or the user interface but can be accessed via the command palette.

Visual Studio Code can be extended via extensions, available through a central repository. This includes additions to the editor and language support. A notable feature is the ability to create extensions that add support for new languages, themes, debuggers, time travel debuggers, perform static code analysis, and add code linters using the Language Server Protocol.

Source control is a built-in feature of Visual Studio Code. It has a dedicated tab inside of the menu bar where users can access version control settings and view changes made to the current project. To use the feature, Visual Studio Code must be linked to any supported version control system (Git, Apache Subversion, Perforce, etc.). This allows users to create repositories as well as to make push and pull requests directly from the Visual Studio Code program.

Visual Studio Code includes multiple extensions for FTP, allowing the software to be used as a free alternative for web development. Code can be synced between the editor and the server, without downloading any extra software.

Visual Studio Code allows users to set the code page in which the active document is saved, the newline character, and the programming language of the active document. This allows it to be used on any platform, in any locale, and for any given programming language.

Visual Studio Code collects usage data and sends it to Microsoft, although this can be disabled. Due to the open-source nature of the application, the telemetry code is accessible to the public, who can see exactly what is collected.

Reception
In the 2016 Developers Survey of Stack Overflow, Visual Studio Code ranked No. 13 among the top popular development tools, with only 7% of the 47,000 respondents using it. Two years later, however, Visual Studio Code achieved the No. 1 spot, with 35% of the 75,000 respondents using it. In the 2019 Developers Survey, Visual Studio Code was also ranked No. 1, with 50% of the 87,000 respondents using it. In the 2021 Developers Survey, Visual Studio Code continued to be ranked No. 1, with 74.5% of the 71,000 respondents using it, rising to 74.48% of the 71,010 responses in the 2022 survey.

See also

 Comparison of integrated development environments
 GitHub Copilot
 List of formerly proprietary software
 Visual Studio
 Eclipse Theia

References

External links

VSCodium 
VSCodium is a community-driven, freely-licensed binary distribution of Microsoft’s editor VS Code.

Github page

2015 software
HTML editors
Java development tools
Linux text editors
MacOS text editors
Microsoft free software
Code
Software using the MIT license
Text editors
Unix text editors
Windows text editors
XML editors